Paul Berch is a New Hampshire lawyer and politician who served in the New Hampshire House of Representatives as a Democrat from 2012 to 2022.

Education
Berch graduated from Calvin Coolidge High School. He earned a B.A. from George Washington University in 1967. Berch also earned a J.D. from University of Chicago in 1970.

Career
Berch is a retired public service attorney. He worked in the private law sector and in the Windham County Public Defender Office from 1975 to 2009.

On November 6, 2012, Berch was elected to the New Hampshire House of Representatives to represent the Cheshire 1 district as a Democrat. He assumed office on December 5, 2012.

Berch was re-elected in 2014, 2016, 2018, and 2020.

In 2022, Berch ran for re-election to represent the Cheshire 15 district. He was defeated in the Democratic primary on September 13, 2022, losing to incumbent Amanda Toll and Renee Monteil, and thus losing an election bid for the first time in nearly a decade. Berch's term concluded on December 7, 2022.

Personal life
Berch resides in Westmoreland, New Hampshire. Berch is married and has two children.

References

Living people
21st-century American politicians
20th-century American lawyers
21st-century American lawyers
Democratic Party members of the New Hampshire House of Representatives
Vermont lawyers
People from Westmoreland, New Hampshire
George Washington University alumni
University of Chicago alumni
Year of birth missing (living people)